The women's openweight judo competition at the 2006 Asian Games in Doha, Qatar was held on 5 December 2006 at the Qatar SC Indoor Hall with nine competitors.

Liu Huanyuan of China won the gold medal.

Schedule
All times are Arabia Standard Time (UTC+03:00)

Results

Main bracket

Repechage

References
Results

External links
 
 Official website

W999
Judo at the Asian Games Women's Openweight
Asian W999